FZI may refer to:

 FZI Forschungszentrum Informatik, a non-profit research institute for applied computer science in Karlsruhe, Germany
 FZI, the FAA LID code for Fostoria Metropolitan Airport, Ohio, United States